First Congregational Church is a congregation of the United Church of Christ located in Eldora, Iowa, United States.   The congregation was organized in 1868 and the church building was individually listed on the National Register of Historic Places in 1996.  In 2010 it was included as a contributing property in the Eldora Downtown Historic District in 2010.

Architecture
The church building was designed in the late Victorian, Romanesque Revival style by Charles Durham and was built from 1893–1894.   The church is constructed of LeGrand hammer dressed limestone.  It measures 47 by 90 feet and the tower rises 57 and a half feet above the cornice line.  The door sills and steps are made of blue stone and the interior is finished in antique oak and hard pine.   Stained glass windows help to illuminate the interior.

See also
Other properties of religious function on the National Register of Historic Places in Hardin County:
Honey Creek Friends' Meetinghouse
St. Matthew's by the Bridge Episcopal Church

References

External links
Church website

Religious organizations established in 1868
Churches completed in 1894
United Church of Christ churches in Iowa
19th-century United Church of Christ church buildings
Romanesque Revival church buildings in Iowa
Eldora, Iowa
Churches in Hardin County, Iowa
Churches on the National Register of Historic Places in Iowa
1868 establishments in Iowa
National Register of Historic Places in Hardin County, Iowa
Individually listed contributing properties to historic districts on the National Register in Iowa